Alfredo Romano Jr (Mendoza, 1988) is an Argentine businessman, professor and philanthropist, co-creator of "Fundación El Potrero". In his youth he was a soccer player at Paris St.Germain (2006). He is an independent economist in favor of dollarization of the economy, author of the essay Dolarizar, un camino hacia la estabilidad económica (Literally Dollarization, a path to economic stability). He collaborates as analyst in several media.

Academic career 
He studied business administration at University of San Andrés. He obtained a master's degree in finance (2015) from the same university, and the "Master of Public Administration in Economic Policy Management" from Columbia University (2018).

He achieved a scholarship by the Wharton School of the University of Pennsylvania, and was also a fellow of the Frankfurt School of Finance & Management in Germany. At Universidad Austral he created in 2020, together with Soledad Castro and Gabriel Chaufan, the capital markets degree program at the School of Economics, and has been its director since then. He teaches the subject "The Fund" in the Business Administration degree.

Professional development 
He is president of the Romano Group since 2012 and co-founder of the Instituto Argentino de Ejecutivos de Finanzas based in Cuyo, a non-profit organization focused on the professional development of executives and managers. 

In 2013, together with a group of friends, he created "Fundación El Potrero". This foundation develops its activity in vulnerable neighborhoods in the province of Buenos Aires and other places in Argentina. Declared of public interest by the Legislature of Buenos Aires, it promotes the integral development of young people, in studies and sports such as soccer, and also supports families. Several young soccer players from "Los Potreros" were hired by some first division clubs, such as Vélez, Tigre, Nueva Chicago, Lanús and Platense. During the pandemic, he promoted the virtual school support platform "Entretiempo". 

As an economist, he is a strong detractor of bimonetarism, standing up for the dollarization of the economy in different forums and in several media. His monetary ideas are expressed in the essay "Dolarizar, un camino hacia la estabilidad económica" (2021) published by El Ateneo with a prologue by Sergio Berensztein. 

He is a contributor to MDZ Radio, the digital publication Infobae, Ambito magazine and La Nación newspaper.

References

External links 
 Interview in Memo by Gabriel Conte
 El Potrero Foundation

21st-century Argentine economists
Business educators
1988 births
Living people
People from Mendoza, Argentina